Urban Search and Rescue Maryland Task Force 1 or MD-TF1 is a FEMA Urban Search and Rescue Task Force based in Montgomery County, Maryland. MD-TF1 is sponsored by Montgomery County Fire & Rescue Service.

References

Maryland 1
Montgomery County, Maryland